Military spacecraft may refer to:
 Military satellite, satellites used for military purposes
 Space weapon, a weapon used for space warfare